Swynnerton's bush squirrel (Paraxerus vexillarius), also known as Svynnerton's bush squirrel, is a species of rodent in the family Sciuridae endemic to Tanzania.  Its natural habitat is subtropical or tropical moist montane forests.

References

Mammals of Tanzania
Endemic fauna of Tanzania
Paraxerus
Mammals described in 1923
Taxonomy articles created by Polbot